Standartenführer Hans Landa is a fictional character and the main antagonist in the 2009 Quentin Tarantino film Inglourious Basterds. He is portrayed by Austrian actor Christoph Waltz. For his performance, Waltz received widespread acclaim and won numerous accolades.

Basis of the character

Standartenführer (SS Colonel) Hans Landa is an Austrian SS officer assigned to the Sicherheitsdienst. He is nicknamed "the Jew Hunter" for his uncanny ability to locate Jews hiding throughout Occupied France. Although he is not blond like Reinhard Heydrich he has the same rank as Joachim Peiper the LSSAH Nazi Officer and looked similar to Peiper. It is unknown how old Hans Landa is in the film. It is also unknown if he was born in around the same time as Reinhard Heydrich in 1904. It is presumed he was born in Vienna, Austria-Hungary in 1904 while Heydrich was born in Halle, Germany.

Egotistical and ambitious, Landa takes a great deal of pride in his fearsome reputation, lauding his nickname "The Jew Hunter" and using it to compare himself to his boss Reinhard Heydrich, whom he describes as disliking the nickname the people of Prague bestowed upon him (“The Hangman”). When the tide of the war turns against the Nazis, he scoffs at it, alluding that his job is to find and capture people and the fact that they are Jews is of no consequence to him.

Besides speaking German, he is also fluent in at least French, English, and Italian.

Landa is intelligent, opportunistic, arrogant, ruthless, and relentless, but can also be circumspect, polite, and charming. He is an opportunist acting only out of pure self-interest. As such, by the end of the film, he unreservedly switches sides to assist the Basterds in  assassinating Hitler and a Nazi Party elite inside a movie theater. In return for his role in the plot, Landa demands full immunity for his war crimes, a house on Nantucket Island, a colonel's military pension, public recognition as an agent working with the American Office of Strategic Services and to be awarded the Medal of Honor.

In 2019, Quentin Tarantino appeared on the podcast Happy Sad Confused, where he discussed Landa's fate after the events of the film. Tarantino facetiously stated that Landa is recognized as a hero in the US and history books for his involvement in ending WWII and helping kill Adolf Hitler, and that he subsequently settles on Nantucket Island, where he is roped in to solve a series of murders as an amateur master detective.

Conception and creation
Quentin Tarantino has said that Landa might be the greatest character he has ever written. He originally wanted Leonardo DiCaprio for the part. Tarantino then decided to have the character played by a German actor. The role ultimately went to the Austrian Waltz, who, according to Tarantino, "gave me my movie back", as he felt the movie could not be made without Landa as a character, but feared the part was "unplayable".

When Waltz auditioned for the role, he had no prior correspondence with Tarantino or producer Lawrence Bender, and believed that the character of Hans Landa was being used during the audition process to cast other roles. Waltz stated that he was most impressed with the dialogue and the depth of the character.

Waltz has described Landa's character as one who has an understanding of how the world works, stating that the swastika means nothing to him. He adds that he is not driven by ideology, and that if anyone were to call Landa a Nazi, he would clarify that he was not, stating that just because he wears a Nazi uniform does not mean that he believes in the Nazi ideology. In describing the ending between the Basterds and Landa, he describes him as "realistic to the point of being inhuman", adding that he understands that the world is not just one thing at a time, and even though these things may contradict each other, they do not necessarily have to.

Reception

Waltz received widespread critical acclaim for his role as Landa, and won the Best Actor Award at the 2009 Cannes Film Festival for his performance. Due to his role as Hans Landa, Waltz has received many offers from directors to play roles in their films, enough for him to describe the situation as "wild".

Film editor Hunter Stephenson commented that international viewers, Americans more so, would be surprised by Waltz's talent in this role, adding that he tipped Waltz to be nominated an Academy Award for Best Supporting Actor. Waltz was awarded several accolades for his performance, including the Golden Globe Award for Best Supporting Actor and the Screen Actors Guild Award in the same category in January 2010. He also won the BAFTA and the Academy Award for Best Supporting Actor, becoming the first actor to win an Oscar for a performance in a Quentin Tarantino film.

Analysis
Hunter Stephenson of /Film describes Landa's calabash as an unsubtle metaphor of masculinity, and describes his love of milk as being left over from an age of innocence and a primal link. Stephenson compared him to Die Hard villain Hans Gruber, played by Alan Rickman, due to his disdain for the inferior intellect of those around him.

Waltz, in an interview, pointed out that the calabash was Tarantino's allusion to Sherlock Holmes, who smoked a similar pipe.

References

Fictional Austrian people
Characters created by Quentin Tarantino
Fictional characters with disfigurements
Fictional colonels
Fictional genocide perpetrators
Fictional mass murderers
Fictional military personnel in films
Fictional war criminals
Fictional Nazis
Fictional World War II veterans
Fictional detectives
Film characters introduced in 2009
Male film villains
Male characters in film